Les LeVeque is an artist based in New York who works with digital and analog electronic technology. His work includes single and multi-channel videos and video/computer-based installations. LeVeque's work uses algorithmic structures, statistically distributed elements, experimentation with the boundaries of interfaces, and provides new views of existing narratives. In 2014 he is a member of the faculty and co-chair of Film and Video at the Milton Avery Graduate School of the Arts, Bard College.

Early life and education
LeVeque holds an MFA from Syracuse University with a concentration in Video.

Experiential video narratives 

In 2014, Les LeVeque's creations are videos which combine and electronically modify appropriated media and filmed social situations to provoke physical, intellectual and emotional response from the viewers. LeVeque employs, in his work, algorithms and computer interface mixed with classical Hollywood films, appropriations of political broadcasts and advertisements, using new technology to provide an alternative view of cinema and to highlight political issues regarding media.  The algorithms produce a visual experience that is not present in the original films.

List of works 
Traders Leaving the Exchange, A Guard and the Street. 2011, 36 minutes, color, stereo, aspect ratio 4:3
Workers Leaving the Factory – Ten Days that Shook The World. Downloaded, repeatedly recompressed and reversed. 2011, 24 minutes, color, stereo, aspect ratio 16:9
Communists Like Us. 2010, 3:28 minutes, black and white, stereo, aspect ratio 4:3 Distributed by Video Data Bank
as the waves play along with an invisible spine (the workers die). 2010, 10:40 minutes, black and white, stereo, aspect ratio 16:9 :Distributed by Video Data Bank
white and fifteen movies starring Charlton Heston 2010, 15 minutes, color, stereo, aspect ratio 16:9 
Distributed by Video Data Bank
a little girl dreams of a new pluralism meanwhile the old war continues V.1. 2009, 67 minutes, black and white, stereo, aspect ratio 16:9
a little girl dreams of a new pluralism meanwhile the old war continues V.2. 2009, 67 minutes, black and white, stereo, aspect ratio 16:9 Distributed by Video Data Bank
stammering forward backward GIANT. 2008, 17:40 minutes, color, stereo, aspect ratio 16:9 Distributed by Video Data Bank
Three Songs of Lenin (like we loved him). 2008, 10:49 minutes, black and white, stereo, aspect ratio 4:3 Distributed by Video Data Bank
Unsung Musicals (Opening numbers) 2005–2008, silent, color A four channel video installation 
16xohwhatabeautifulmornin. 37 minutes
16xthehillsarealivewiththesoundofmusic 71 minutes 
32xtwolittlegirlsfromlittlerock. 42 minutes 
32xnewyorknewyork. 150 minutes Represented by KS Art, New York
Repeating The End. 2006, color, stereo A three-channel video and three mp3 player installation
Beginning. 80 minutes
Middle. 80 minutes
End. 80 minutes Represented by KS Art, New York
Memorial Stadium Slow Death (The full torture of death speed)x16. 2005, 5 minutes, color, stereo, 
Distributed as part of the Electronic Re-mix Project
Dramatically Repeating Lawrence of Arabia. 2004, 14:43 minutes, color, stereo Distributed by Video Data Bank
AutoCraving 15. 2004, 7:30 minutes, color, stereo
Doubling Forbidden Planet. 2003, 99 minutes, color, stereo, Represented by KS Art, New York
Notes From The Underground. 2003, 4:44 minutes, color, stereo Distributed by Video Data Bank
Strained Andromeda Strain. 2002, 6:55 minutes, color, stereo Distributed by Video Data Bank
Pulse pharma phantasm 2002, 6:16 minutes, color, stereo Distributed by Video Data Bank 
Astronauts Trip.  A single channel video installation 2002, 7:00 minutes, color, stereo
Mister Speaker. Perry Bard and Les LeVeque 2002, 3:00 minutes, audio project
Stutter the Searchers. 2001, 12:15 minutes, color, stereo Distributed by Video Data Bank
Red Green Blue Gone with the Wind.  2001, 11:45 minutes, color, stereo Distributed by Video Data Bank
Backwards Birth of a Nation.  2000, 13 minutes, black and white, stereo Distributed by Video Data Bank
4 Vertigo 2000, 9 minutes, color, stereo Distributed by Video Data Bank
4 Vertigo (a 4 channel video installation)
4 Vertigo (a web project)
2 Spellbound. 1999, 7:30 minutes, black and white, stereo Distributed by Video Data Bank
A Song From The Cultural Revolution. 1998, 5 minutes, color, stereo Distributed by Video Data Bank
flight. 1998, 7 minutes, color, stereo Distributed by Video Data Bank
flight (a  four-channel video installation)
Encoded Facial Gestures, #1, #2, #3, #4. 1997, 7:30 minutes, color, stereo Distributed by Video Data Bank
Dissing D.A.R.E: education as spectacle. Les LeVeque and Diane Nerwen 1997, 6 minutes, color, stereo Distributed by Video Data Bank
Is It Love (#2). A six-channel video installation. 1997, black and white, silent
Thorazine Rebel. Daniella Dooling and Les LeVeque 1997, 8:22, color, stereo
Quartet. A 4-channel inter-active sound installation 1997
Is It Love. An inter-active multi-channel video installation
1996
You Kept Our Rendezvous. A ten-channel inter-active sound installation 1996
the free space of the commodity. 1995, 2:52 minutes, color, stereo Distributed by Video Data Bank
KEPT. Les LeVeque and Diane Nerwen 1995, 1:52 minutes, black and white, color, stereo
GASP. Les LeVeque and Diane Nerwen 1993, 13 minutes, color, stereo
PREEXISTING CONDITIONS. Les LeVeque and Diane Nerwen. 1992, 9:30 minutes, color, stereo Distributed by V Tape
Untitled. A multi-channel kinetic video installation. 1992
Noisy Insignificance. John Knecht and Les LeVeque A ten-channel video installation
More Questions Concerning Technology. A multi-channel kinetic video installation. 1991
THE WARDEN THREW A PARTY. Diane Nerwen and Les LeVeque 1991, 6:42 minutes, color, stereo Distributed by V Tape
LIGHT SWEET CRUDE. Les LeVeque and Diane Nerwen 1991, 11:34 minutes, color, stereo Distributed by V Tape
Some Questions Concerning Technology. A multi-channel kinetic video installation 1990
GENERAL EDUCATION Lesson 1: Partnerships. 1990, 2:34 minutes, color, stereo
FREDDIE BRICE PAINTS TWO PAINTINGS. Les LeVeque and Kerry Schuss 1990, 22:30 minutes, color, stereo, 22:30 ::Represented by KS Art, New York

References

External links 
Les LeVeque at Video Data Bank
Les LeVeque at Kerry Schuss Art
Les LeVeque at Bard College
Les LeVeque at ArtDaily.org
Les LeVeque at Experimental Television Center

Year of birth missing (living people)
Living people